Doctor Who is a British science fiction television programme produced by the BBC since 1963. Hundreds of novelisations of the series have been published by various publishers, the majority based on the original 1963–1989 run of the series.

History

Frederick Muller Ltd.
Frederick Muller Ltd. commissioned David Whitaker to novelise the first Dalek serial under the title Doctor Who in an Exciting Adventure with the Daleks, which was published November 1964 in hardcover just in time for the second Dalek serial, The Dalek Invasion of Earth to be transmitted. The success of this book warranted two reprintings by 1965 and led Frederick Muller to commission two further novelisations, Doctor Who and the Zarbi and Doctor Who and the Crusaders, which were published in 1965 and 1966 respectively.  Sales of these books did not live up to the first and so the short range was brought to an end.

Doctor Who in an Exciting Adventure with the Daleks was reissued in paperback October 1965 by Armada Books, an imprint of May Fair Books, with new illustrations.  Doctor Who and the Crusaders was reissued in paperback in 1967 by Green Dragon, an imprint of Atlantic Books, again with new illustrations.  All three books with reissued in hardcover in 1975 by White Lion, all featuring Tom Baker's Fourth Doctor on the cover while retaining the First Doctor illustrations inside.

Target Books 
In 1972 Universal-Tandem Publishing was looking to create a children's book imprint, Target Books. In a visit to Frederick Muller's offices, the three 1960s Doctor Who books were optioned, and then the BBC was contacted with a view to publish new books. This call to the BBC met with enthusiastic support from the current script editor, Terrance Dicks. The Doctor Who novelisations quickly became a backbone of the imprint, surviving corporate acquisitions and novelising almost every Doctor Who television story. New novelisations under the Target imprint came to an end in 1991 (although three more were published under their parent company's new Doctor Who Books imprint). Reprints under the Target imprint continued through 1994.

A short series entitled The Companions of Doctor Who comprised the novelisation of K-9 and Company along with the original works Turlough and the Earthlink Dilemma and Harry Sullivan's War. In addition to the television serials, three scripts from the cancelled Season 23—The Nightmare Fair, The Ultimate Evil and Mission to Magnus—were novelised. The former sold less well than the usual novelisations, while the latter sold as well. Target also novelised two additional non-televised stories: the radio play Slipback and the audio story The Pescatons.

Doctor Who Books 
Virgin Books created a new imprint, Doctor Who Books, for their Doctor Who novels and non-fiction books. This imprint published the last three books in the "Doctor Who Library" established by Target. (The Power of the Daleks, The Evil of the Daleks, and the radio play The Paradise of Death)

Further novelisations were published as part of their monthly novel lines. Barry Letts's radio drama, The Ghosts of N-Space was published as part of the Virgin Missing Adventures range in 1995, as was the novelisation of the independent spin-off Downtime in 1996. The Virgin New Adventures range published a novelisation of Shakedown: The Return of the Sontarans in 1995.

BBC Books 
In 1996 the BBC chose not to renew Virgin's license for publishing Doctor Who fiction, preferring to bring the novels back in house.  BBC Books published a novelisation of the 1996 Doctor Who television movie. They also published a novelisation of the webcast Scream of the Shalka as part of the Past Doctor Adventures range in 2004. From 2012 to 2019, BBC Books published novelisations of the 1970s and 1980s serials Target was unable to publish (The Pirate Planet, City of Death, Shada, Resurrection of the Daleks, and Revelation of the Daleks).  Novelisations of the unproduced scripts Doctor Who and the Krikkitmen and Doctor Who Meets Scratchman were published in 2018 and 2019 respectively.

BBC Books began reprinting selected Target novelisations starting in July 2011.

The Target Collection
Starting in 2018, BBC Books published novelisations of selected episodes of the revived series as part of a range dubbed The Target Collection featuring the Target logo. Paperback editions of City of Death, The Pirate Planet, Resurrection of the Daleks, Revelation of the Daleks, and the 1996 television movie were also added to the revived Target range. (City of Death and The Pirate Planet were abridged from their previous BBC Books editions.) In 2022, printed versions of the previously audiobook-only adaptations by David Fisher of The Stones of Blood and The Androids of Tara were also added to the range.

Audiobooks

In 2005, BBC Audio released unabridged audiobook versions of the first three Frederick Muller novelisations, read by actor William Russell (who played Ian Chesterton). Beginning in September 2007, they began releasing further unabridged audiobooks of the Target novelisations at a regular rate.

An Unearthly Child was set to receive a new novelisation exclusive to audio, read by William Russell, written by Nigel Robinson, and released by AudioGo. The audiobook was originally scheduled to be released November 2013, but the release was cancelled due to AudioGo's bankruptcy. After being rescheduled for a November 2014 release and then pulled from the schedule, rights issues are currently preventing its release.

Pearson Education

Pearson Education published adaptations of four Eleventh Doctor stories in 2011 (two of which were photnovelisations) and six Twelfth Doctor stories in 2018 for use in schools.

Publication details

Writing
Although Target endeavoured to commission the original scriptwriters to novelise their own stories, this was not always possible. As a result, many books in the Target line were written by Terrance Dicks. During the late 1970s to early 1980s, Target, which classified the novelisations as children's fiction, imposed a page limit of 128 pages. Some books (particularly several by Dicks) even fell short of this limit. By the late 1980s, however, the page cap had been lifted, although John Peel was still required to split his novelisation of the epic 12-episode The Daleks' Master Plan into two volumes because the manuscript was too long.

Titles
For the first few years of the Target line, it was common practice for the novels to have titles that differed from the adapted serials: for example, Doctor Who and the Auton Invasion, which was based upon the serial Spearhead from Space. This practice was dropped in the mid-1970s. Another tradition established by the books was to prepend the words "Doctor Who and ..." to the titles, except in a few cases where impractical. This practice continued until the early 1980s. From 1990 onwards reprints of the books generally dropped "Doctor Who and..." from the title and changed titles back to the original television story, although some of the reprints merely rejacketed earlier stock.

Illustrators
The first of the Target reissues featured new cover artwork by Chris Achilleos, who went on to illustrate over 30 of the novelisations throughout the 1970s.
British artist Andrew Skilleter created much of the cover art from 1979 to 1994, along with video covers and other merchandise. His work on Doctor Who was showcased in his 1995 volume Blacklight: The Art of Andrew Skilleter.

Numbering
Target began numbering its novelisations from 1983, with almost all of the first seventy-three books being numbered as reprints came out. The first new book to be numbered was Time-Flight. Target's numbering did not initially reflect original publication order (which would have placed David Whitaker's Doctor Who and the Daleks book first) or the production or broadcast order of the original stories, but rather was conducted in alphabetical order, so that the novelisation of The Abominable Snowmen was numbered "1". Due to print delays and last-minute reordering of publication schedules, some of the later books were released out of numeric order. The revived "Target Collection" from BBC Books is not numbered.

Novelisations of television stories

First Doctor 
Featuring William Hartnell's First Doctor

Second Doctor 
Featuring Patrick Troughton's Second Doctor

Third Doctor 
Featuring Jon Pertwee's Third Doctor.

Fourth Doctor 
Featuring Tom Baker's Fourth Doctor.

Fifth Doctor 
Featuring Peter Davison's Fifth Doctor.

Sixth Doctor 
Featuring Colin Baker's Sixth Doctor.

Seventh Doctor 
Featuring Sylvester McCoy's Seventh Doctor.

Eighth Doctor 
Featuring Paul McGann's Eighth Doctor.

Ninth Doctor 
Featuring Christopher Eccleston's Ninth Doctor.

Tenth Doctor 
Featuring David Tennant's Tenth Doctor.

Eleventh Doctor 
Featuring Matt Smith's Eleventh Doctor.

Twelfth Doctor 
Featuring Peter Capaldi's Twelfth Doctor.

Thirteenth Doctor 
Featuring Jodie Whittaker's Thirteenth Doctor.

Novelisations of audio dramas
Novelisations of audio dramas broadcast on radio or released on home audio.

Novelisations of unproduced stories
Novelisations of stories written, but not produced, for television or film.
<includeonly>'Novelisations of the orignally planned season 23</includeonly>

Novelisations of webcasts
Novelisations of stories released via the web.

Novelisations of comic strips
Audiobook adaptations of comics from World Distributors' Doctor Who AnnualsUnofficial novelisations
A number of fan-run publications have published unofficial novelisations of stories Target was not able to secure rights to. Obverse Books has also published unofficial novelisations to raise money for charity. As well as novelisations of the two 1960s Dalek films, Obverse also published original novels presented as novelisations of further films based on other television stories featuring Peter Cushing's portrayal of Dr. Who and short story collections presented as novelisations of hypothetical episodes of the proposed 1960s radio adaptions, also featuring Cushing's Dr. Who.  

Omnibus and two in one releases

A number of novelisations were released in omnibus editions, mostly by book clubs.

In 1988–1989, W. H. Allen's Star imprint published a number of the Target novelisations in a format of two novelisations in one book in a range titled Doctor Who Classics.  These were produced by fixing together two Target books with a new front page and outer cover. The pairings were:

Spin-off novelisations 
 The Companions of Doctor Who The Companions of Doctor Who was a series of original full-length novels, the first original novels based on Doctor Who. The books were based on characters who had appeared in the television series as the Doctor's companions, and explored their lives after leaving the Doctor's company.

The first two books were Turlough and the Earthlink Dilemma by Tony Attwood, based upon the character played by Mark Strickson in the early 1980s, and Harry Sullivan's War, written by Ian Marter, who had played Harry Sullivan in the series a decade earlier. These books sold well, but after a third attempt (a novelisation of the 1981 Doctor Who spin-off, K-9 and Company) the series ended due to rights disputes between the publishers and the BBC. Other novels would have featured Tegan, the Brigadier, Victoria and Mike Yates.

The Sarah Jane Adventures
Beginning in 2007, Penguin Books under its Penguin Character Books imprint began publishing novelisations based upon the spinoff series The Sarah Jane Adventures.

Direct to video spinoffs
Novelisations of spin off productions that were released direct to video.

Audio spinoffs

Adaptations
Generally, Doctor Who stories that have been broadcast will be adapted into print, rather than vice versa. There have been three occasions where print media has been adapted for the screen or formed inspiration for television episodes.

The 1995 New Adventures novel Human Nature, written by Paul Cornell and featuring the Seventh Doctor, was adapted by the same author for the 2007 series of Doctor Who as a two part story with the episode titles "Human Nature" and "The Family of Blood", with David Tennant as the Tenth Doctor.

Steven Moffat based his 2007 episode "Blink" upon his 2005 short story, "What I Did on My Christmas Holidays by Sally Sparrow", originally published in Doctor Who Annual 2006.

Gareth Roberts reused his concept from a 2006 Doctor Who Magazine comic strip story as the basis for an episode of the same name "The Lodger", which was transmitted as part of Series 5 (2010), featuring Matt Smith.

See also
List of Torchwood novels and audio books
List of Doctor Who novelists
Dalek comic strips, illustrated annuals and graphic novels
List of television series made into books

References

 Bibliography 

 
 

External links
On Target, a guide to Target novelisations
The TARDIS Library: Books A comprehensive guide to all official & unofficial Doctor Who'' novelisations and other books ever published

Book series introduced in 1964
 
Novelisations